Jacksonville Executive at Craig Airport , formerly known as Craig Municipal Airport, is a public airport located eight miles (13 km) east of the central business district of Jacksonville, in Duval County, Florida, United States. It is owned by the Jacksonville Aviation Authority.

This mid-sized general aviation airport handles personal aircraft and small commuter planes. The entrance is located along St. Johns Bluff Road north of Atlantic Boulevard, although it also borders Atlantic Blvd to the south. The airport has a control tower and handles 400-500 aircraft operations daily.  It previously served as a joint civil-military airport hosting an Army Aviation Support Facility and helicopter units of the Florida Army National Guard prior to their relocation to nearby Cecil Field following the latter facility's inactivation as a naval air station in 1999.

The United States Navy's Blue Angels performed their first airshow at Jacksonville Executive at Craig Airport on June 15, 1946.

Facilities and aircraft 

Runway 5/23 was repaved during the summer of 2011. In addition to filling cracks and adding a 120- x 150-foot blast pad, the entire runway was surfed with a 0.5-inch leveling course and a 1.5 inch Superpave surface course. In January 2012, the paving project was awarded the inaugural Ray Brown Airport Pavement Award by the National Asphalt Pavement Association, recognizing it as the highest quality airport asphalt pavement project completed during 2011.

For the 12-month period ending October 20, 1999, the airport had 158,769 aircraft operations, an average of 434 per day: 86% general aviation, 9% military and 5% air taxi. There are 319 aircraft based at this airport: 57% single-engine, 27% multi-engine, 7% helicopter, 6% military and 4% jet (12).

The airport has 2 FBOs on the field, JAX Executive Jet Center and Sky Harbor Aviation.

References

External links 
 Jacksonville Executive at Craig Airport page at the Jacksonville Aviation Authority website
  brochure from CFASPP
 
 

Airports in Jacksonville, Florida
Arlington, Jacksonville